An orchestra pit is the area in a theater (usually located in a lowered area in front of the stage) in which musicians perform.  Orchestral pits are utilized in forms of theatre that require music (such as opera and ballet) or in cases when incidental music is required.  The conductor is typically positioned at the front of the orchestral pit facing the stage.

Construction
In the pit, the walls are specially designed to provide the best possible acoustics, ensuring that the sound of the orchestra flows through the entire venue without overwhelming the performance on stage. Many orchestra pits are also designed to have reasonably low decibel levels, allowing musicians to work without fears of damaging their hearing. Typically, a small platform in the pit accommodates the conductor, so that he or she can be seen by all of the musicians, who may sit in chairs or on bleachers, depending on the design of the pit. All sorts of musicians sit here, from the conductor to the bass player.

The lift can usually be lowered all the way to a storage space under the stage, or halfway to floor level, or all the way up level with the stage. When lowered all the way, the lift can be filled with equipment or props from underneath the stage and then raised and unloaded on stage. The pit can be raised so it is level with the floor of the audience seats to accommodate more seating area. This is common when the stage is being used for a rock show and then the pit area is used for standing room. When the pit is raised all the way up, level with the stage, it can be used as part of the stage to give more room for larger shows.  Having a lift set up this way gives the theatre much more flexibility and ability to adapt to different events that occur in the theatre. It allows many different setups, each one personal to certain types of productions.

An orchestra pit does not have to be located directly in front of the stage, either, although many patrons expect to see the orchestra performing in front of the stage; when an orchestra pit is elsewhere in the theaters, the conductor's movements may be broadcast on monitors visible from the stage, so that the actors can follow cues.

History
Earlier in theatre history from 1500–1650 the orchestra pit was also called the yard and it was a lower level that lower-class members of the audience would stand to watch the show.   It was generally very crowded and hard to see the full stage.  The amount of space in the yard varied with different stages.  Everyone else would sit in the normal seating where the whole stage was visible.  Since then the orchestra pit has been changed and enhanced to work better with modern theatre. Now orchestra pits are designed much better and have a lot of different uses.

Uses

Sometimes when an opera or musical is being performed in the theatre and there is a need for live music the orchestra pit will be lowered all the way down and the musicians will play down in the pit in front of the stage. This way the director of the orchestra is able to see what is happening on stage and has a better feel for when to start and stop the music.  Sometimes there are very precise cues that director needs to give for certain sound effects and it is crucial that they are done at the right time. Having the orchestra play in the pit creates a problem because often there is a lack of space and the sound quality suffers because instruments bleed into other instrument’s microphones when everyone is squeezed close together.

Before the 19th century the conductor stood at the stage edge, facing the audience and orchestra, with his back toward the onstage performers as shown in the Palais Garnier orchestra pit plan. During the late 19th century the typical conductor location changed.  Now the conductor stands in front of the first row of audience, with his back to the audience, facing the orchestra and facing the performers on stage.

See also

 Pit orchestra
 Benshi

References

Parts of a theatre
Pit